The Brock Badgers women's ice hockey team represents Brock University in St. Catharines, Ontario in the sport of ice hockey in the Ontario University Athletics (OUA) conference of U Sports. The Badgers program first began in 2000 and have won one OUA championship. The team is led by head coach Margot Page, who has held that position since 2015.

History

Recent season-by-season record

Season team scoring champion

Awards and honours
Former Badgers hockey player Niamh Haughey was identified as Olympic talent during an RBC Training Ground combine event held at Brock University in 2018. For the 2020-21 season, she was named as one of 33 athletes to the Canadian national bobsled team.

University Awards
Jessica Fickel, Brock 2013-14 Female Athlete of the Year Award

Athletes of the Week
Jensen Murphy, Brock Badgers Female Athlete of the Week (awarded November 25, 2019 and January 6, 2020)
Cassidy Maplethorpe, Brock Badgers Female Athlete of the Week (awarded December 12, 2019 and January 20, 2020)

Team Awards

Most Valuable Player
2019-20: Jensen Murphy

Rookie of the Year
2019-20: Emma Irwin

OUA Awards
Todd Erskine, 2004-05 OUA (East) Coach of the Year
Kate Allgood, 2005-06 OUA Most Valuable Player
Kate Allgood, 2005-06 OUA Forward of the Year
Kate Allgood, 2006-07 OUA Forward of the Year
Jim Denham, 2010-11 OUA Coach of the Year 
Kelly Walker, 2010-11 OUA Forward of the Year
Kelly Walker, 2010-11 OUA Most Valuable Player
Annie Berg, 2016-17 OUA Rookie of the Year
Jensen Murphy, 2019-20 OUA Goaltender of the Year

OUA All-Stars
Beth Clause, 2009-10 OUA Second Team All-Star

USports Awards
Annie Berg, 2017 USports All-Rookie Team

Retired Jerseys 
 #9 Jessica Fickel

Badgers in professional hockey

International
Jessica Fickel : 2015 Winter Universiade 
 Annie Berg : Ice hockey at the 2019 Winter Universiade

See also
 Ontario University Athletics women's ice hockey

References

Brock University athletics
U Sports women's ice hockey teams
Women's ice hockey teams in Canada
Ice hockey teams in Ontario
Women in Ontario